William G. Anderson D.O. (born December 12, 1927) was the first African-American who was a member of the Board of Trustees of the American Osteopathic Association (AOA) for twenty years where he also served as president. He was best known for his role in the Albany Movement, which Anderson led, was formed by local activists in Albany, Georgia in 1961.

Biography

Anderson was born in Americus, Georgia, on December 12, 1927, to John D. Anderson and Emma Gilchrist Anderson. After obtaining an undergraduate degree from Alabama State College for Negroes (now Alabama State University) in 1949, Anderson attended Des Moines University in Des Moines, Iowa, and received his certification in surgery.

Anderson served as associate dean of the Kirksville College of Osteopathic Medicine, a clinical professor of osteopathic surgical specialties at Michigan State University's College of Osteopathic Medicine and was responsible for the development of osteopathic medical education programs for students, interns, and residents at Oakland General, Detroit Riverview, Macomb and St. John Hospitals (all of which would late merge into St. John Providence Health System) as well Michigan Osteopathic Medical Center.

Anderson is perhaps best known for his work in the Civil Rights Movement.  In 1957, after completing his residency in Flint, Michigan, Anderson relocated to Albany, Georgia, to start his practice. However, because of the stringent segregationist policies in place and racist attitudes of local townsfolk, Anderson was prevented from treating patients. Anderson decided to respond to this unjust resistance by becoming the founder and first president of the Albany Movement.

Anderson took part in hundreds of civil rights marches and worked closely with Martin Luther King Jr. He went to prison in December 1961, sent back to his hometown, on charges of an unlawful march, that in the view of him, King and others was a walk to hold prayers at city hall in Albany.

Anderson is also a member of Physicians for Social Responsibility.

As of 2010, Anderson is the member of the board of directors at the Virginia campus of VCOM, the Edward Via College of Osteopathic Medicine. He is also a faculty member at the Michigan State University College of Osteopathic Medicine, which hosts an annual civil rights lecture series in his name.

References

External links
Edward Via College of Osteopathic Medicine Virginia-Carolinas
University of Michigan Health System

American osteopathic physicians
African-American physicians
African-American activists
Activists for African-American civil rights
History of Georgia (U.S. state)
A. T. Still University faculty
Michigan State University faculty
Alabama State University alumni
Des Moines University alumni
People from Americus, Georgia
Living people
1927 births
21st-century African-American people